Fundo Loma Larga Airport ,  is an airport serving the Loma Larga winery  north of Casablanca, a city in the Valparaíso Region of Chile.

See also

Transport in Chile
List of airports in Chile

References

External links
OpenStreetMap - Loma Larga
OurAirports - Fundo Loma Larga
SkyVector - Fundo Loma Larga
FallingRain - Loma Larga Airport

Airports in Valparaíso Region